The Priestly Fraternity of the Missionaries of St. Charles Borromeo (FSCB), or also known as the Fraternity of St. Charles, was founded in Rome on 14 September 1985 by then Fr. Massimo Camisasca as a society of apostolic life. The fraternity obtained pontifical recognition in 1999.

History
The group started with seven priests and ten seminarians, but now numbers about 120 priests the Fraternity, explicitly inspired by the person and charism of Fr. Luigi Giussani Italian founder of the New Evangelization lay movement Communion and Liberation. It is present in over twenty countries including the United States, Mexico, Chile, Paraguay, Taiwan, Kenya and Russia. Prominent members include Massimo Camisasca, Bishop of Reggio Emilia-Guastalla, Italy, and Paolo Pezzi, the archbishop of Moscow.

The missionaries are trained in their seminaries in Rome, in Washington D.C. and in Santiago, Chile. The motto of the Fraternity of St. Charles is Passio Christi Gloria, which translates to "Passion for the Glory of Christ".

On 25 March 2007 an order of sisters, called Missionaries Sisters of Saint Charles Borromeo was founded, modeled after the Fraternity of St. Charles.

See also
Servant of God Luigi Giussani
Communion and Liberation

References

External links 
 

Societies of apostolic life
Communion and Liberation
Religious organizations established in the 1980s